Konsultativnaya Psikhologiya i Psikhoterapiya is a Russian peer-reviewed scientific journal containing original research, systematic reviews etc. relating to the area of psychotherapy and counseling psychology. Having begun publishing in 1992, it became the first Russian journal on psychotherapy. It is published 4 times a year. The journal is indexed by the Supreme Certification Commission of Russia. The editor-in-chief is Fyodor Vasilyuk.

Formerly the journal was called the Moskovskiy Psikhoterapevticheskiy Zhurnal.

Much attention is given to the study of the relationship between psychotherapy and the Christian doctrine of salvation. A special issue on Christian psychology is published every year.

See also
 List of psychotherapy journals
 Journal of Psychology & Theology

References

External links 
  
 PsyJournals.ru – electronic versions of the journal's articles
 Moscow City University of Psychology and Education - about the publisher 

Psychotherapy journals
Quarterly journals
Hybrid open access journals
Russian-language journals
Publications established in 1992